Antarctic Bay is a bay in the Greenland Sea coast of the Crown Prince Christian Land peninsula, King Frederick VIII Land, Northeastern Greenland. Administratively the bay and its surroundings belong to the Northeast Greenland National Park.

The area of the bay is uninhabited.

History
The bay was named by the 1906-1908 Denmark expedition after Alfred Gabriel Nathorst's ship Antarctic.

Geography
Antarctic Bay opens to the Fram Strait of the Greenland Sea. It lies between Amdrup Land to the west and the Flade Isblink ice cap to the north. Sophus Müller Naes is the southwestern point of the bay. Kilen lies just a few km north of the ice-covered head and northeastern shore of the bay. The waters of bay are clogged by fast ice the year round.

References

External links
Tectono-stratigraphic history of Northern Amdrup Land, North-East Greenland - Implications for the northernmost East Greenland shelf
Synthetic structural map of the base of the Kim Fjelde Formation

Bays of Greenland